Muchesh (also Romanized as Mūchesh; also known as Mūjash) is a city and capital of Muchesh District, in Kamyaran County, Kurdistan Province, Iran. At the 2006 census, its population was 2,950, in 769 families. The city is populated by Kurds.

References

Towns and villages in Kamyaran County
Cities in Kurdistan Province
Kurdish settlements in Kurdistan Province